SBS Medianet is a South Korean company by SBS Media Holdings, producing media, broadcast and telecommunication products for non free-to-air networks, including Skylife and 'Cable TV'(KCTA) service providers.

Television networks 
 SBS Plus - drama and entertainment programs
 SBS F!L - lifestyle type of entertainment programs
 SBS Sports - sport (both professional and amateur)
 SBS Biz - business and news
 SBS funE - entertainment and variety programs
 SBS Golf - golf
 SBS M - music
 KiZmom - children's programming

See also 
 Economy of South Korea
 List of South Korean companies
 Communications in South Korea

External links 
 SBS Medianet (Korean)

Seoul Broadcasting System television networks
Korean-language television stations
Broadcasting companies of South Korea